Kerling is a mukim (town) in Hulu Selangor District, Selangor, Malaysia. The attraction in this town is Kolam Air Panas (hot spring). The town's name is not related to the similarly sounding racial slur Keling, which is a derogatory slur to Malaysian Indians.

References

Hulu Selangor District
Mukims of Selangor